Ilir Lame (born 11 October 1956) is an Albanian footballer. He played in eleven matches for the Albania national football team from 1980 to 1984.

References

External links
 

1956 births
Living people
Albanian footballers
Albania international footballers
Place of birth missing (living people)
Association footballers not categorized by position